|}

The Midsummer Stakes is a Listed flat horse race in Great Britain open to horses aged three years or older.
It is run at Windsor over a distance of 1 mile and 31 yards (1,638 metres), and it is scheduled to take place each year in June.

The race was first run in 2004.

Records

Leading jockey (2 wins):
Jamie Spencer – Hazyview (2005), Custom Cut (2014)
Kieran Shoemark -  Pogo (2020), Century Dream (2021) 

Leading trainer (3 wins):
 Saeed bin Suroor – Librettist (2006), Winged Cupid (2007), French Navy (2013)

Winners

See also 
 Horse racing in Great Britain
 List of British flat horse races

References
Racing Post:

Open mile category horse races
Windsor Racecourse
Flat races in Great Britain
Recurring sporting events established in 2004
2004 establishments in England